Admiral of the Fleet Sir Charles Morice Pole, 1st Baronet GCB (18 January 1757 – 6 September 1830) was a Royal Navy officer, colonial governor and banker. As a junior officer he saw action at the siege of Pondicherry in India during the American Revolutionary War. After taking command of the fifth-rate HMS Success he captured and then destroyed the Spanish frigate Santa Catalina in the Strait of Gibraltar in the action of 16 March 1782 later in that War.

After capturing the French privateer Vanneau in June 1793, Pole took part in the siege of Toulon at an early stage of the French Revolutionary Wars. He went on to be governor and commander-in-chief of Newfoundland and then commanded the Baltic Fleet later in the War. He also served as a Lord Commissioner of the Admiralty on the Admiralty Board led by Viscount Howick during the Napoleonic Wars.

From 1820 to 1822, he served as Governor of the Bank of England.

Early career
Born the second son of Reginald Pole and Anne Pole (née Buller), Pole was educated at Plympton Grammar School before joining the Royal Naval Academy at Portsmouth in January 1770. He was appointed to the fifth-rate HMS Thames in 1772 and then transferred to the fourth-rate HMS Salisbury on the East Indies Station in December 1773. Promoted to lieutenant on 26 June 1777, he was assigned to the sixth-rate HMS Seahorse and then transferred to the fourth-rate HMS Rippon in 1778 and saw action at the siege of Pondicherry in India in October 1778 during the American Revolutionary War. He then became commanding officer of the sloop HMS Cormorant and was sent home with the despatches.

Promoted to captain on 22 March 1779, Pole became commanding officer of the first-rate HMS Britannia, flagship of Rear Admiral George Darby, Second-in-Command of the Channel Squadron. He transferred to the command of the sixth-rate HMS Hussar in 1780 which ran aground off Hell Gate although he was acquitted at the subsequent court-martial. He was given command of the fifth-rate HMS Success and in her, while undertaking an escort mission in support of the armed store-ship HMS Vernon, captured and then destroyed the Spanish frigate Santa Catalina in the Strait of Gibraltar in the action of 16 March 1782.

Following the end of the War, Pole was given command of the third-rate HMS Crown before becoming Groom of the Bedchamber to the Duke of Clarence on 1 June 1789. He became commanding officer of the fifth-rate HMS Melampus in 1790, in which he watched the French fleet at Brest, and of the third-rate HMS Illustrious in 1791.

Pole transferred to the command of the third-rate HMS Colossus in the Mediterranean Fleet in early 1793 and, after capturing the French privateer Vanneau in June 1793, took part in the siege of Toulon at an early stage of the French Revolutionary Wars.

Senior command

Promoted to rear-admiral on 1 June 1795, Pole became Second-in-Command of the West Indies Station with his flag in HMS Colossus. He went on to be Captain of the Fleet in the Channel Squadron under Lord Bridport in March 1797. It fell to Pole to advise the Admiralty about the strikes by sailors demanding better pay and conditions which came to be known as the Spithead mutiny. Pole returned to Spithead with negotiators from the Admiralty but talks broke down when Admiral Sir Alan Gardner threatened to hang all the mutineers.

Pole became governor and commander-in-chief of Newfoundland on 3 June 1800: following his appointment he focussed on dealing with a serious outbreak of smallpox that had taken place, deploying the latest practices in inoculation and establishing a "Committee for the Relief of the Poor". Promoted to vice-admiral on 1 January 1801, he became Commander-in-Chief of the Baltic Fleet, with his flag in the second-rate HMS St George in June 1801.

Pole was created a baronet on 18 August 1801 and then became Member of Parliament for Newark in 1802. In December 1802 he was asked to chair a commission of naval inquiry into abuses in the civil administration which reported in May 1803.

Promoted to full admiral on 9 November 1805, Pole was present at the funeral of Lord Nelson in January 1806. He became a Lord Commissioner of the Admiralty on the Admiralty Board led by Viscount Howick in February 1806. He was also elected Member of Parliament for Plymouth in November 1806. However he stood down as a Lord Commissioner when the Second Portland Ministry took power in March 1807: in Parliament he became increasingly critical of the new Government particularly in relation to their handling of the raid on Copenhagen in 1807 (which led to the Anglo-Russian War) and the Convention of Sintra in 1808 (which allowed the French to evacuate their troops from Portugal).

Pole was appointed a Knight Commander of the Order of the Bath on 12 April 1815 and advanced to Knight Grand Cross of the Order of the Bath on 20 April 1818. He went on to be Deputy Governor of the Bank of England in 1818 and Governor of the Bank of England in 1820. He became Sheriff of Hertfordshire in November 1824, and having been promoted to Admiral of the Fleet on 22 July 1830, he died at his home, Aldenham Abbey, on 6 September 1830.

Family
In 1792 Pole married Henrietta Goddard; they had two daughters.

See also 
 Governors of Newfoundland
 List of people from Newfoundland and Labrador

References

Sources

External links 
 

1757 births
1830 deaths
Baronets in the Baronetage of the United Kingdom
Royal Navy admirals of the fleet
Royal Navy personnel of the French Revolutionary Wars
Lords of the Admiralty
Governors of Newfoundland Colony
Members of the Parliament of the United Kingdom for Plymouth
UK MPs 1806–1807
UK MPs 1807–1812
UK MPs 1812–1818
Governors of the Bank of England
Fellows of the Royal Society
Deputy Governors of the Bank of England